The Lagos Accord was a peace agreement signed on August 21, 1979, by representatives of eleven warring factions of  the Chadian Civil War, after a conference in Lagos, Nigeria. The accord established the procedures for setting up the Transitional Government of National Unity (GUNT), which was sworn into office in November, 1979. By mutual agreement, Goukouni Oueddei was named president, Wadel Abdelkader Kamougué was appointed vice-president, and Hissène Habré was named minister of national defense, veterans, and war victims. The distribution of cabinet positions was balanced between south (eleven portfolios), north, center, and east (thirteen), and among protégés of neighboring states.

A peacekeeping mission of the Organisation of African Unity (OAU), to be drawn from troops from Republic of the Congo, Guinea, and Benin, was to replace the French. This force never materialized in any effective sense.

The participants of  GUNT deeply mistrusted each other, and they never achieved a sense of coherence. As a result, the various factional militias remained armed. By January 1980, a unit of Habré's army was attacking the forces of one of the constituent groups of GUNT in Ouaddaï Prefecture, and the Chadian conflict soon reached new heights of intensity with widespread destruction of life and property.

See also
Kano Accord
FROLINAT
History of Chad

Sources
Library of Congress Country Study

External links
Frustrations of Regional Peacekeeping: The OAU in Chad, 1977-1982
Full texts of Peace Agreements for Chad

1979 in Chad
Peace treaties of Chad
Treaties concluded in 1979
1979 in Nigeria
20th century in Lagos